The Seniors International Golf Championship was a golf tournament on the Champions Tour from 1982 to 1987. It was played in Hilton Head Island, South Carolina at the Shipyard Golf Club (1982–1984), at the Planters Row Golf Club (1985), and at the Harbour Town GL (1986–1987).

The purse for the 1987 tournament was US$250,000, with $37,500 going to the winner. The tournament was founded in 1982 as the Hilton Head Seniors International.

Winners
The Seniors International Golf Championship
1987 Al Geiberger

Cuyahoga Seniors International
1986 Butch Baird

Hilton Head Seniors International
1985 Mike Fetchick
1984 Lee Elder
1983 Miller Barber
1982 Miller Barber and Dan Sikes (tie)

Source:

References

Former PGA Tour Champions events
Golf in South Carolina
Recurring sporting events established in 1982
Recurring sporting events disestablished in 1987
1982 establishments in South Carolina
1987 disestablishments in South Carolina